Jens Jønsson (born 10 January 1993) is a Danish professional footballer who plays as a midfielder for Greek Super League club AEK Athens.

Club career
Born in Aarhus, Denmark, Jønsson moved up to local team AGF's first team in summer 2011. Prior to that he was playing for the IF Lyseng. On 10 December 2012, Jønsson scored a goal for the final result of 3–3 against Silkeborg IF in the last minute of the last match of 2012 in the Danish Superliga. This goal was later awarded "Best Goal of 2012" by the viewers of DR award show "Sport 2012".

On 26 August 2016, he signed a three-year contract with the Turkish Süper Lig club Konyaspor. With Konyaspor he won the Turkish Cup and Super Cup in 2017. At the European level, he was utilised in four group matches of the 2016–17 and 2017–18 UEFA Europa League. Konyaspor was eliminated after the group stage each year.

On 25 August 2020, Jønsson signed a two-year deal with the newly promoted La Liga side Cádiz CF.

AEK Athens
On 1 July 2022, AEK Athens' technical director Radosław Kucharski travelled to Copenhagen to complete Jønsson's signing, with the Danish player putting pen to paper to a four-year contract.

International career
On 3 November 2020 he received his first call-up by Denmark senior national team.

Career statistics

Club

Honours
Konyaspor
 Turkish Cup: 2016–17
 Turkish Super Cup: 2017

References

External links

 
 
 Official Danish Superliga stats 

1993 births
Living people
Danish men's footballers
Denmark youth international footballers
Denmark under-21 international footballers
Denmark international footballers
Olympic footballers of Denmark
Danish expatriate men's footballers
IF Lyseng Fodbold players
Aarhus Gymnastikforening players
Konyaspor footballers
Cádiz CF players
AEK Athens F.C. players
Danish Superliga players
Danish 1st Division players
Süper Lig players
La Liga players
Super League Greece players
Footballers from Aarhus
Association football midfielders
Footballers at the 2016 Summer Olympics
Expatriate footballers in Greece
Expatriate footballers in Turkey
Expatriate footballers in Spain
Danish expatriate sportspeople in Turkey
Danish expatriate sportspeople in Spain
Danish expatriate sportspeople in Greece